Bartolomeo Cesi (died 1537) was a Roman Catholic prelate who served as Bishop of Narni (1524–1537).

Biography
On 1 Jul 1524, Bartolomeo Cesi was appointed during the papacy of Pope Clement VII as Bishop of Narni.
On 25 Jul 1524, he was consecrated bishop.
He served as Bishop of Narni until his death in 1537.

While bishop, he was the principal consecrator of Paride de Grassis, Bishop of Pesaro (1513).

References

External links and additional sources
 (Chronology of Bishops) 
 (Chronology of Bishops) 

16th-century Italian Roman Catholic bishops
Bishops appointed by Pope Clement VII
1537 deaths